Atlantis: The Lost Empire, released on May 21, 2001, is the soundtrack to the 2001 Disney animated film of the same name.  Consisting primarily of James Newton Howard's score, it also includes the Diane Warren penned song, "Where the Dream Takes You", performed by Mýa.

Come Sail Away by Styx was used in various advertisements for the film but not in the film itself. Also, Wipeout is used in one of the advertisements though is not in the film itself.

Track listing 

 

Disney animation soundtracks
2000s film soundtrack albums
2001 soundtrack albums
Walt Disney Records soundtracks
Soundtrack